Debaser may refer to:
"Debaser", a song by American alternative rock band Pixies
Debaser (rap group), a hip-hop group forming part of the crew Sandpeople
Debaser (band), a defunct Canadian indie rock band